Marc Vervenne (born on 16 April 1949) is a Belgian theologian. 

From August 2005 till July 2009 he was the rector of the Katholieke Universiteit Leuven. In 2005, he won the elections for new rector in the third round on Tuesday 24 May 2005 by beating Rik Torfs with 50.81% to 49.19%. Before becoming rector, he was vice-rector of the Human sciences group. On 3 December 2008 the university announced that he would not serve a second term. On 1 August 2009 Mark Waer became the new rector.

Early life
Born in Ypres, Belgium, Vervenne first went to the seminary to become a priest, but quit in 1973. He then started work in the construction industry as lorry driver. Later, he studied theology in Leuven and in 1986 he received his PhD in Theology. He's a specialist of the Old Testament. He is visiting scholar at the universities of Lille (France) and Kinshasa (Congo).

Marc Vervenne is married to Christine De Roo and they have three children: Hannes (1978), Hilke (1980) and Bastiaan (1983).

References

External links
 Official website
 Katholieke Universiteit Leuven

1949 births
Living people
20th-century Belgian Roman Catholic theologians
KU Leuven alumni
Academic staff of KU Leuven
People from Ypres
21st-century Belgian Roman Catholic theologians